Flo Gennaro (born January 9, 1991 in Rosario, Santa Fe) is an Argentine fashion model.  She has modeled for Ann Demeulemeester, Chaiken, Christian Dior, Costello Tagliapietra, Doo.Ri, Lanvin, Louis Vuitton, Marni, and Nina Ricci and has appeared on the cover of D, Qvest, and Korean Vogue Girl. She was named one of the top 10 models of Spring 2008 by V magazine.

References

External links

 
 
 

1991 births
Living people
Argentine female models
21st-century Argentine women